This is a list of the individuals who were, at any given time, considered the next in line to inherit the throne of England, should the incumbent monarch die. Those who actually succeeded (at any future time) are shown in bold. Stillborn children and infants surviving less than a month are not included.

It may be noted that the succession was highly uncertain, and was not governed by a fixed convention, for much of the century after the Norman Conquest of 1066.

Significant breaks in the succession, where the designated heir did not in fact succeed (due to usurpation, conquest, revolution, or lack of heirs) are shown as breaks in the table below.

The symbols +1, +2, etc. are to be read "once (twice, etc.) removed in descendancy", i.e., the child or grandchild (etc.) of a cousin of the degree specified. The symbols −1, −2, etc. indicate the converse relationship, i.e., the cousin of a parent or grandparent (etc.).

1066 to 1135: The Normans

1135 to 1154: The Blois

1154 to 1399: Plantagenets

1399 to 1461: The Lancasters

1461 to 1470: Briefly the Yorks

1470 to 1471: Briefly the Lancasters, again

1471 to 1485: Briefly the Yorks, again

1485 to 1603: The Tudors

1603 to 1707: The Stuarts

Jacobite succession, 1689–1807 
The following are the heirs of the Jacobite pretenders to the throne to the death of the last Stuart pretender. For other persons in this lineage, see Jacobite succession.

See also 
 List of heirs to the Scottish throne
 List of heirs to the British throne
 Line of succession to the British throne
 History of the English line of succession

Sources 
 Ian Mortimer, The Fears of Henry IV: the Life of England's Self-Made King (Vintage, 2008)

References 

 
Succession to the British crown
English
British monarchy-related lists